Colombia Adventist University Corporation in Spanish:(Corporacion Universitaria Adventista - UNAC) is a Seventh-day Adventist co-educational university located in Medellin, Colombia, and accredited by the Adventist Accrediting Association.

It is a part of the Seventh-day Adventist education system, the world's second largest Christian school system.

History
Founded in 1937 as Industrial College Coloveno, it later became Colombo-Venezuelan Institute in 1950, and Colombia Adventist University in 1981. UNAC offers undergraduate and graduate doctoral level degrees.

See also

 List of Seventh-day Adventist colleges and universities
 Seventh-day Adventist education
 Seventh-day Adventist Church
 Seventh-day Adventist theology
 History of the Seventh-day Adventist Church
Adventist Colleges and Universities

References

External links
Colombia Adventist University

Universities and colleges affiliated with the Seventh-day Adventist Church